Synaptic may refer to:

 Synapse, part of the nervous system
 Synaptic (software), a Linux graphical package management program
 Synaptics, a semiconductor manufacturer
 Synaptics (Mouse on Mars EP), 2017

See also
 Synapse (disambiguation)
 Synapsis, the pairing of two homologous chromosomes